Elam W. Russell Sr. (February 8, 1828 – April 2, 1897) was an American politician from the state of Missouri. He was the son of the Honorable James and Elizabeth Gilliland Russell and the grandson of William Russell who was born in Scotland.  

In 1851, he was appointed county surveyor and served in that office until 1855.  In March 1857, he married Cape Girardeau County-native Nercena Clodfelter.  In 1858, he was elected as sheriff and collector and served in these offices until 1861.  In 1880, he was elected to serve Cape Girardeau County in the state legislature.  In 1892, he was defeated for re-election to the office of state representative by Republican John J. Sawyer, 2206 to 1989 votes.  He had been the first president of the Jackson Exchange Bank at the time of his death.

His son Robert W. Russell later became the mayor of Jackson, Missouri.

References

1828 births
1897 deaths
19th-century American politicians
Missouri Democrats